Axylia is a genus of moths of the family Noctuidae. The genus was described by Jacob Hübner in 1821.

Species
 Axylia annularis Saalmüller, 1891
 Axylia belophora D. S. Fletcher, 1961
 Axylia bryi Laporte, 1984
 Axylia coniorta (Hampson, 1903)
 Axylia dallolmoi Berio, 1972
 Axylia destefanii Berio, 1944
 Axylia dispilata Swinhoe, 1891
 Axylia edwardsi D. S. Fletcher, 1961
 Axylia extranea (Berio, 1972)
 Axylia gabriellae Laporte, 1975
 Axylia ikondae Berio, 1972
 Axylia infusa Berio, 1972
 Axylia intimima D. S. Fletcher, 1961
 Axylia marthae Laporte, 1984
 Axylia orbicularis Laporte, 1984
 Axylia posterioducta D. S. Fletcher, 1961
 Axylia putris - the flame (Linnaeus, 1761)
 Axylia renalis Moore, 1881
 Axylia rhodopea (Hampson, 1907)
 Axylia sanyetiensis Laporte, 1984
 Axylia sciodes D. S. Fletcher, 1961
 Axylia vespertina Laporte, 1984

References
 
 

 
Noctuinae